James or Jim Kearney may refer to:

 James Kearney (politician), member of the Ireland parliament for Kinsale, 1768–1790
 James E. Kearney (1884–1977), bishop of the Roman Catholic Diocese of Rochester
 Jim Kearney (American football) (born 1943), former American football safety
 Jim Kearney (Australian footballer) (1894–1944), Australian rules football player
 Jim Kearney (rugby union) (1920–1998), New Zealand international rugby union player